The Berlin State Museums are a group of institutions in Berlin, Germany, comprising seventeen museums in five clusters, several research institutes, libraries, and supporting facilities. They are overseen by the Prussian Cultural Heritage Foundation and funded by the German federal government in collaboration with Germany's federal states. The central complex on Museum Island was added to the UNESCO list of World Heritage Sites in 1999. By 2007, the Berlin State Museums had grown into the largest complex of museums in Europe. The museum was originally founded by King Friedrich Wilhelm III of Prussia in 1823 as the Königliche Museen (in English, Royal Museums).

The director-general of the Berlin State Museums is Michael Eissenhauer.

Museum locations

Berlin-Mitte 
 Museum Island
 Altes Museum: Roman and Greek Classical Antiquities
 Alte Nationalgalerie: 19th century sculptures and paintings.
 Bode-Museum: the Numismatic Collection, Sculpture Collection and the Museum of Byzantine Art
 Neues Museum: the Egyptian Museum of Berlin and its Papyrus Collection, and the Museum für Vor- und Frühgeschichte (Prehistory and Early History)
 Pergamon Museum: the Antikensammlung Berlin, Museum of Islamic art, Museum of the Ancient Near East and the Central Archive
 Friedrichswerder Church: early 19th century sculptures

Tiergarten/Moabit 
Kulturforum
Gemäldegalerie: Old Masters paintings
Kunstgewerbemuseum: Museum of decorative art
Kupferstichkabinett: Drawings and print room
Kunstbibliothek: Art Library
Neue Nationalgalerie: New National Gallery
Hamburger Bahnhof: Museum for contemporary art including the Flick Collection

Charlottenburg 
Museum Berggruen: classic modern art
Museum of Photography / Helmut Newton Foundation
Museum Scharf-Gerstenberg: surrealist art
Gipsformerei (Replica workshop)

Dahlem 
Ethnological Museum of Berlin: American Archaeology, Music Ethnology, North American Indians, South Sea, East Asia, Africa, Junior Museum
Museum of Asian Art: Collection of South, Southeast and Central Asian Art; Collection of East Asian Art
Museum Europäischer Kulturen: European Cultures

Köpenick Palace

Berlin State Library
Two locations, Haus Unter Den Linden and Haus Potsdamer Straße, are open to the public; various others are not.

Research institutes
Institute for Museum Research
Rathgen Research Laboratory
Center for Provenance Research and Investigation

See also 
 List of museums in Berlin

References

External links 

 Berlin State Museums website
 Online publication of the acquisition record books and accession inventories

 

Prussian cultural sites
Prussian Cultural Heritage Foundation